Rowntree Halt was a minor unmanned railway stop on the Foss Islands branch line in York. Located on the southern edge of the Rowntree's chocolate factory, Rowntree Halt was opened in 1927 by the London and North Eastern Railway to provide a low-volume, not publicly advertised passenger service to the Rowntree factory for workers commuting from areas south of York such as Selby and Doncaster. The halt itself was little more than a single short platform located a few yards west of a signal-protected siding that allowed freight directly into the factory complex. Passenger services ceased in 1988, and the station was officially closed on 8 July 1988. The line was dismantled and turned into a cycle track.

References

Disused railway stations in North Yorkshire
Rail transport in York
Railway stations in Great Britain opened in 1927
Railway stations in Great Britain closed in 1988
Former London and North Eastern Railway stations